The Wingate School (TWS) is a British international private school in the Mexico City metropolitan area that will open in August 2016; it will eventually serve ages three through 18.

The first campus to open will be the Virreyes campus, in Lomas de Chapultepec, Miguel Hidalgo, while the Huixquilucan campus, serving the Interlomas area, will open in 2017. The Interlomas campus will serve early years through secondary school while the Virreyes campus will only serve primary school.

History
The Wingate School's Headteacher and key founder is Thomas Wingate, a British man who has lived in Mexico for various periods since 1986. Wingate, a resident of Mexico married to a Mexican former diplomat, had previously taught in Mexico, the United States and England.

Curriculum
The school's primary curriculum is the International Primary Curriculum (IPC) which will lead onto the IGCSEs and full IB Diploma Programme.

References

External links

 The Wingate School
 The Wingate School 

British international schools in Mexico
Private schools in Mexico
High schools in the State of Mexico
Schools in Mexico City
Miguel Hidalgo, Mexico City
2016 establishments in Mexico
Educational institutions established in 2016